Gudur Junction railway station (station code: GDR) is an Indian Railways station in Gudur of Andhra Pradesh. It is a major junction station with branch lines to Arakkonam Junction and Katpadi Junction. It is administered under Vijayawada railway division of South Coast Railway zone (formerly South Central Railway zone).

History 
The Vijayawada–Chennai link was established in 1899. The Chirala–Elavur section was electrified in 1980–81.

Classification 
In terms of earnings and outward passengers handled, Gudur is categorized as a Non-Suburban Grade-3 (NSG-3) railway station. Based on the re–categorization of Indian Railway stations for the period of 2017–18 and 2022–23, an NSG–3 category station earns between – crore and handles  passengers.

Station amenities 
Gudur Junction is one of the 38 stations in the division to be equipped with Automatic Ticket Vending Machines (ATVMs). Newly introduced Gudur–Vijayawada Intercity Express runs from Gudur to Vijayawada.

References

External links 

Railway stations in Nellore district
Vijayawada railway division
Railway stations in India opened in 1899
Railway junction stations in Andhra Pradesh